The Giro dell'Appennino is a semi classic European bicycle race held in the Apennine Mountains, Italy. Since 2005, the race has been organised as a 1.1 event on the UCI Europe Tour.

Famous riders like Fausto Coppi, Francesco Moser, Felice Gimondi, Gianni Bugno and Gilberto Simoni have won the race.

Winners

References

External links
 

Recurring sporting events established in 1934
1934 establishments in Italy
UCI Europe Tour races
Cycle races in Italy
Classic cycle races